Moment in Peking, sometimes called New Moment in Peking to distinguish it from earlier adaptations, is a 2014 Chinese television series loosely based on Lin Yutang's English-language novel of the same name.

Cast and characters
 Yao family
 Chin Han as Yao Siyuan
 Li Lingyu as Yao's wife
 Song Ning as Yao Diren
 Li Sheng as Yao Mulan
 Kan Qingzi as Yao Mochou
Deng Lun as Yao Difei

 Niu family
 Kent Cheng as Niu Sidao
 Li Fang-wen as Niu's wife
 Li Man as Niu Suyun
 Zhao Wei as Niu Huaiyu
 Peng Ling as Niu Tongyu

 Zeng family
 Xu Min as Zeng Wenpu
 Jiang Lili as Zeng's wife
 Fu Yiwei as Zeng's concubine
 Wang Jialin as Zeng Binya
 Song Yunhao as Zeng Jingya
 Lee Seung-hyun as Zeng Xinya

 Others
 Gao Ziqi as Kong Lifu

2014 Chinese television series debuts
2014 Chinese television series endings
Chinese period television series
Television shows set in Beijing
Television shows based on Chinese novels